Cancanilla de Marbella (or Cancanilla de Málaga) is the artistic name of the gypsy singer and dancer Sebastián Heredia Santiago, born in Marbella, Spain, in 1951, and resident in Madrid.

Career 
He comes from a family of flamenco roots. He is son of the cantaora María Santiago and brother of "La Chichi" and "Taroque", both dedicated to flamenco dancing and now retired from the stage. He started at the age of eleven in the tablao El Platero, in his home town, signing and dancing for tourists. As well as being a cantaor, he is also an outstanding dancer.

At the age of fifteen he traveled to America with the cast of José Greco and later with Lola Flores, staying two years in Mexico, where he worked in a tablao.

In Madrid, he worked in tablao Los Canasteros de Manolo Caracol and in Corral de la Morería, with the dancer Blanca del Rey, and gained a reputation in the flamenco dance scene. Together with Javier Barón,  won the first Giraldillo de Baile at the Bienal de Sevilla.  He studied to sing solo and won several awards, the most important  Premio Enrique El Mellizo at the renowned Concurso Nacional de Arte Flamenco de Córdoba in 1998.

Cancanilla is considered a very good professional, with a wide repertoire, he has a deep knowledge of the different styles of flamenco, as well as an outstanding artistic sense and a great command of compás with a typical aesthetic of the school of Mairena.His way of singing covers the melodic arc from Cádiz to Alcalá de Guadaíra, that is, from El Mellizo to Joaquín el de la Paula, passing through Frijones, Joaniquín, La Serneta and Yllanda. Some lyrics are similar to the border romances of the Middle Ages and the Renaissance.

Cancanilla has been working for most of his life in cante atrás, that is to say, singing for dancing, especially in the intimate setting of the tablao. In 2005 he decided to dedicate himself exclusively to solo singing. He has released two collective albums and four solo albums.

At the end of the 1980s his first album appeared and in 1993 he recorded, together with Enrique de Melchor, a second album. He took part in the Historical Recordings (Vol. 42) and in 2003 he released Sonido gitano de Málaga. In 2007 he began the preparation of a new album, "El Cante de Cancanilla". It belongs to the collection recorded in the label "Fontana" in 1972, and has been reedited by José Manuel Gamboa, with a selection of the following songs: alegrías, tangos, natural fandangos, tarantos, bulerías de Marbella (bulerías with personal details whose lyrics allude to Marbella), seguiriyas, tientos, soleá (to dance), bulerías and fandangos de Huelva. He has shared the stage with Camarón, Fosforito, José Mercé, José Menese, Chano Lobato, and Vicente Soto among others.

References 

Flamenco singers
Flamenco dancers
1951 births
Living people
People from Marbella